Ethan Benjamin Allen (October 21, 1781 Hillsdale, Columbia County, New York – April 19, 1835 Batavia, Genesee County, New York) was an American lawyer and politician from New York.

Life
He was the son of Benjamin Allen and Hannah (Rowley) Allen. He married Harriet Eliza Seymour (1794–1867), and they had several children.

He was a member of the New York State Senate (8th D.) from 1826 to 1829, sitting in the 49th, 50th, 51st and 52nd New York State Legislatures.

Sources
The New York Civil List compiled by Franklin Benjamin Hough (pages 126ff and 138; Weed, Parsons and Co., 1858)
Genealogical Journal of the Utah Genealogical Society (1995; pg. 19f) [gives birth year "1781"]

External links
 [gives birth year "1787", but no source, or image of tombstone]

1781 births
1835 deaths
People from Hillsdale, New York
New York (state) state senators
New York (state) Democratic-Republicans
People from Batavia, New York
19th-century American politicians